2015 Regional League Division 2 Northern Region is the seventh season of the League competition since its establishment in 2009. It is in the third tier of the Thai football league system.

Changes from last season

Team changes

Promoted clubs

Sukkhothai and Phichit were promoted to the 2015 Thai Division 1 League.

Relegated clubs

Phitsanulok were relegated from the 2014 Thai Division 1 League.

Relocated clubs

Lopburi re-located to the Regional League Northern Division from the Central-East Division 2012.
Singburi re-located to the Regional League Northern Division from the Central-West Division 2014.

Withdrawn clubs

Uthai Thani and Tak have withdrawn from the 2015 campaign.

Expansion clubs

Tak City joined the newly expanded league setup.

Stadium and locations

League table

References

External links
 Kondivision 2

Regional League Northern Division seasons